Rosport is the capital of the commune of Rosport-Mompach in eastern Luxembourg. It is part of the canton of Echternach, which is part of the district of Grevenmacher.

Until 31 December 2017, it was a commune. On 1 January 2018, the commune was merged with Mompach to form the new commune of Rosport-Mompach.

Rosport Castle, built in 1892, was the home of the Luxembourg inventor Henri Tudor. Since May 2009, the castle has been home to the Tudor Museum where there is an exhibition based on his development of the lead–acid battery.

Former commune
The former commune consisted of the villages:
 Dickweiler
 Girst
 Hinkel
 Osweiler
 Rosport
 Steinheim
 Fromburg (lieu-dit)
 Girsterklaus (lieu-dit)

References

External links
 

 
Towns in Luxembourg
Former communes of Luxembourg